Glomfjorden is a fjord in the municipality of Meløy in Nordland county, Norway. The fjord is located just north of the Svartisen glacier between some very steep mountains that lie along the edges of the fjord. The villages of Glomfjord and Vassdalsvik are located along the fjord. The island of Messøya is located at the mouth of the fjord, near the village of Ørnes.

See also
 List of Norwegian fjords

References

Meløy
Fjords of Nordland